Karksi-Nuia (before 1987 Nuia) is a town in Mulgi Parish, Viljandi County, southern Estonia close to the Latvian border. The nearest villages are Univere to the west, Polli and Karksi to the north, and Kõvaküla to the south.

History
Karksi was first mentioned in the 12th century as an administrative center.

Karksi Castle

A vogt of Karksi is mentioned in written records for the first time in 1248, and construction of a castle in Karksi started sometime during the Middle Ages. Completion was however delayed as the castle was destroyed several times during the period. When it was finally completed during the 14th century, it was for a time an important stronghold for the Teutonic Order in southern Estonia, and since 1470 the residence of the local commander. During the Great Northern War the castle was destroyed and never rebuilt. Very little remains of the inner castle, which was separated from the outer ward by a moat, but the outer walls and two square towers are relatively well-preserved. The castle was built by rubble stone and brick. Today, the ruins are used as a backdrop for various cultural and sports event.

Geography
Karksi-Nuia is situated in the southern part of Viljandi County. It is part of the Karksi Parish, a municipality that consists of the town and the 20 villages around it.

Gallery

Notable residents
 Margus Hunt, defensive end for the Indianapolis Colts, former discus thrower and the former world junior record holder in discus throw.
 Märt Israel, discus thrower
 Kalle Jents, politician
 Margus Pirksaar, competitive runner

See also
Battle of Karksi (1600)

References

Cities and towns in Estonia
Populated places established in the 12th century
Former municipalities of Estonia
Kreis Pernau